The Braille pattern dots-146 is a 6-dot braille cell with both top, and the bottom right dots raised, or an 8-dot braille cell with both top, and the lower-middle right dots raised. It is represented by the Unicode code point U+2829, and in Braille ASCII with the percent sign: %.

Unified braille

In unified international braille, the braille pattern dots-146 is used to represent a voiceless palato-alveolar fricative, i.e. /ʃ/ and otherwise as needed.

Table of unified braille values

Other braille

Plus dots 7 and 8

Related to Braille pattern dots-146 are Braille patterns 1467, 1468, and 14678, which are used in 8-dot braille systems, such as Gardner-Salinas and Luxembourgish Braille.

Related 8-dot kantenji patterns

In the Japanese kantenji braille, the standard 8-dot Braille patterns 258, 1258, 2458, and 12458 are the patterns related to Braille pattern dots-146, since the two additional dots of kantenji patterns 0146, 1467, and 01467 are placed above the base 6-dot cell, instead of below, as in standard 8-dot braille.

Kantenji using braille patterns 258, 1258, 2458, or 12458

This listing includes kantenji using Braille pattern dots-146 for all 6349 kanji found in JIS C 6226-1978.

  - 草

Variants and thematic compounds

  -  selector 3 + く/艹  =  艸
  -  selector 5 + く/艹  =  禺
  -  selector 6 + く/艹  =  莫
  -  selector 6 + selector 6 + く/艹  =  屮
  -  く/艹 + selector 4  =  丘
  -  く/艹 + selector 6  =  卉
  -  比 + く/艹  =  升
  -  し/巿 + く/艹  =  黒

Compounds of 草 and 艹

  -  れ/口 + く/艹  =  嘆
  -  氷/氵 + く/艹  =  漢
  -  く/艹 + い/糹/#2  =  難
  -  な/亻 + く/艹 + い/糹/#2  =  儺
  -  て/扌 + く/艹 + い/糹/#2  =  攤
  -  に/氵 + く/艹 + い/糹/#2  =  灘
  -  つ/土 + く/艹  =  塔
  -  く/艹 + く/艹  =  荒
  -  る/忄 + く/艹  =  慌
  -  た/⽥ + く/艹  =  苗
  -  て/扌 + く/艹  =  描
  -  か/金 + く/艹  =  錨
  -  け/犬 + く/艹  =  獲
  -  の/禾 + く/艹  =  穫
  -  え/訁 + く/艹  =  護
  -  心 + く/艹  =  菱
  -  と/戸 + く/艹  =  著
  -  つ/土 + と/戸 + く/艹  =  墸
  -  み/耳 + と/戸 + く/艹  =  躇
  -  く/艹 + ん/止  =  歎
  -  く/艹 + 比  =  花
  -  つ/土 + く/艹 + 比  =  埖
  -  き/木 + く/艹 + 比  =  椛
  -  ま/石 + く/艹 + 比  =  硴
  -  の/禾 + く/艹 + 比  =  糀
  -  か/金 + く/艹 + 比  =  錵
  -  く/艹 + ほ/方  =  芳
  -  か/金 + く/艹 + ほ/方  =  錺
  -  せ/食 + く/艹 + ほ/方  =  餝
  -  く/艹 + ほ/方 + や/疒  =  蔟
  -  く/艹 + え/訁  =  芸
  -  く/艹 + く/艹 + え/訁  =  藝
  -  れ/口 + く/艹 + え/訁  =  囈
  -  く/艹 + め/目  =  芽
  -  く/艹 + 数  =  若
  -  る/忄 + く/艹 + 数  =  惹
  -  く/艹 + ろ/十  =  苦
  -  く/艹 + お/頁  =  英
  -  日 + く/艹 + お/頁  =  暎
  -  へ/⺩ + く/艹 + お/頁  =  瑛
  -  ち/竹 + く/艹 + お/頁  =  霙
  -  く/艹 + ひ/辶  =  茂
  -  く/艹 + け/犬  =  茎
  -  く/艹 + く/艹 + け/犬  =  莖
  -  く/艹 + へ/⺩  =  荘
  -  く/艹 + く/艹 + へ/⺩  =  莊
  -  く/艹 + な/亻  =  荷
  -  く/艹 + 囗  =  菌
  -  く/艹 + き/木  =  菓
  -  く/艹 + ち/竹  =  菜
  -  く/艹 + か/金  =  華
  -  れ/口 + く/艹 + か/金  =  嘩
  -  日 + く/艹 + か/金  =  曄
  -  心 + く/艹 + か/金  =  樺
  -  え/訁 + く/艹 + か/金  =  譁
  -  く/艹 + ふ/女  =  萎
  -  く/艹 + れ/口  =  落
  -  く/艹 + よ/广  =  葉
  -  く/艹 + と/戸  =  葬
  -  く/艹 + み/耳  =  葺
  -  く/艹 + に/氵  =  蒸
  -  く/艹 + た/⽥  =  蓄
  -  く/艹 + す/発  =  蔵
  -  く/艹 + く/艹 + す/発  =  藏
  -  く/艹 + て/扌  =  薄
  -  く/艹 + そ/馬  =  薦
  -  く/艹 + ま/石  =  薪
  -  く/艹 + 火  =  薫
  -  く/艹 + ゐ/幺  =  薬
  -  く/艹 + く/艹 + ゐ/幺  =  藥
  -  く/艹 + 氷/氵  =  藩
  -  く/艹 + ⺼  =  蘊
  -  氷/氵 + 宿 + く/艹  =  濛
  -  く/艹 + 宿 + ら/月  =  臈
  -  ふ/女 + 宿 + く/艹  =  艨
  -  く/艹 + 龸 + の/禾  =  芟
  -  く/艹 + 宿 + り/分  =  芬
  -  く/艹 + 宿 + 心  =  芯
  -  く/艹 + め/目 + ぬ/力  =  苅
  -  く/艹 + 宿 + う/宀/#3  =  苑
  -  く/艹 + ろ/十 + 囗  =  苒
  -  く/艹 + 比 + か/金  =  苛
  -  く/艹 + も/門 + selector 2  =  苞
  -  く/艹 + も/門 + selector 5  =  苟
  -  く/艹 + selector 1 + す/発  =  苣
  -  く/艹 + れ/口 + と/戸  =  苫
  -  く/艹 + す/発 + selector 1  =  苳
  -  く/艹 + selector 5 + そ/馬  =  苴
  -  く/艹 + な/亻 + し/巿  =  苻
  -  く/艹 + 宿 + さ/阝  =  范
  -  く/艹 + す/発 + れ/口  =  茖
  -  く/艹 + selector 5 + こ/子  =  茣
  -  く/艹 + selector 5 + ほ/方  =  茫
  -  く/艹 + ゐ/幺 + ゐ/幺  =  茲
  -  く/艹 + 囗 + れ/口  =  茴
  -  く/艹 + 囗 + け/犬  =  茵
  -  く/艹 + ふ/女 + れ/口  =  茹
  -  く/艹 + ろ/十 + こ/子  =  荐
  -  く/艹 + な/亻 + ま/石  =  莅
  -  く/艹 + ぬ/力 + そ/馬  =  莇
  -  く/艹 + は/辶 + selector 1  =  莚
  -  く/艹 + り/分 + れ/口  =  莟
  -  く/艹 + 宿 + な/亻  =  莢
  -  く/艹 + け/犬 + と/戸  =  莽
  -  く/艹 + selector 6 + 心  =  菴
  -  く/艹 + selector 5 + り/分  =  菷
  -  く/艹 + お/頁 + ろ/十  =  萃
  -  く/艹 + ふ/女 + さ/阝  =  萋
  -  く/艹 + 日 + ら/月  =  萌
  -  く/艹 + り/分 + か/金  =  萍
  -  く/艹 + ら/月 + ら/月  =  萠
  -  く/艹 + に/氵 + selector 3  =  萢
  -  く/艹 + 宿 + け/犬  =  萼
  -  く/艹 + な/亻 + れ/口  =  葆
  -  く/艹 + 龸 + り/分  =  董
  -  く/艹 + 日 + selector 1  =  葩
  -  く/艹 + い/糹/#2 + も/門  =  葯
  -  く/艹 + 宿 + む/車  =  葷
  -  く/艹 + ま/石 + し/巿  =  蒂
  -  く/艹 + 宿 + し/巿  =  蒄
  -  く/艹 + お/頁 + に/氵  =  蒐
  -  く/艹 + 日 + し/巿  =  蒔
  -  く/艹 + 宿 + そ/馬  =  蒙
  -  く/艹 + り/分 + お/頁  =  蒼
  -  く/艹 + け/犬 + の/禾  =  蓁
  -  く/艹 + よ/广 + せ/食  =  蓆
  -  く/艹 + こ/子 + む/車  =  蓊
  -  く/艹 + し/巿 + ろ/十  =  蓐
  -  く/艹 + 宿 + ね/示  =  蓑
  -  く/艹 + よ/广 + な/亻  =  蓙
  -  く/艹 + な/亻 + う/宀/#3  =  蓚
  -  く/艹 + ま/石 + さ/阝  =  蔀
  -  く/艹 + 宿 + ま/石  =  蔓
  -  く/艹 + し/巿 + よ/广  =  蔕
  -  く/艹 + selector 1 + う/宀/#3  =  蔘
  -  く/艹 + と/戸 + ね/示  =  蔚
  -  く/艹 + ね/示 + さ/阝  =  蔡
  -  く/艹 + さ/阝 + ゑ/訁  =  蔭
  -  く/艹 + 宿 + 氷/氵  =  蔽
  -  く/艹 + の/禾 + た/⽥  =  蕃
  -  く/艹 + ん/止 + ん/止  =  蕋
  -  く/艹 + 龸 + け/犬  =  蕚
  -  く/艹 + に/氵 + 数  =  蕩
  -  く/艹 + ち/竹 + た/⽥  =  蕾
  -  く/艹 + り/分 + え/訁  =  薈
  -  く/艹 + 囗 + え/訁  =  薗
  -  く/艹 + や/疒 + selector 2  =  薙
  -  く/艹 + selector 6 + ま/石  =  薜
  -  く/艹 + ほ/方 + selector 2  =  薨
  -  く/艹 + 宿 + 数  =  薮
  -  く/艹 + selector 4 + な/亻  =  薹
  -  く/艹 + 宿 + き/木  =  藁
  -  く/艹 + 日 + ね/示  =  藉
  -  く/艹 + そ/馬 + 日  =  藐
  -  く/艹 + 龸 + 数  =  藪
  -  く/艹 + え/訁 + 氷/氵  =  藹
  -  く/艹 + 心 + 心  =  蘂
  -  く/艹 + 宿 + に/氵  =  蘯
  -  く/艹 + 龸 + ま/石  =  蘰
  -  む/車 + 宿 + く/艹  =  蟇
  -  む/車 + 龸 + く/艹  =  蠖
  -  え/訁 + 宿 + く/艹  =  謨
  -  そ/馬 + 宿 + く/艹  =  驀
  -  く/艹 + 宿 + や/疒  =  艱

Compounds of 禺

  -  な/亻 + く/艹  =  偶
  -  う/宀/#3 + く/艹  =  寓
  -  ひ/辶 + く/艹  =  遇
  -  さ/阝 + く/艹  =  隅
  -  く/艹 + 心  =  愚
  -  く/艹 + selector 5 + く/艹  =  藕
  -  や/疒 + う/宀/#3 + く/艹  =  嵎

Compounds of 莫

  -  き/木 + く/艹  =  模
  -  ⺼ + く/艹  =  膜
  -  く/艹 + ぬ/力  =  募
  -  く/艹 + つ/土  =  墓
  -  く/艹 + し/巿  =  幕
  -  宿 + く/艹 + し/巿  =  冪
  -  す/発 + く/艹 + し/巿  =  羃
  -  く/艹 + る/忄  =  慕
  -  く/艹 + 日  =  暮
  -  の/禾 + selector 6 + く/艹  =  糢
  -  む/車 + selector 6 + く/艹  =  蟆
  -  そ/馬 + selector 6 + く/艹  =  貘
  -  う/宀/#3 + 宿 + く/艹  =  寞
  -  て/扌 + 宿 + く/艹  =  摸
  -  に/氵 + 宿 + く/艹  =  漠
  -  け/犬 + 宿 + く/艹  =  獏

Compounds of 丘

  -  く/艹 + り/分  =  兵
  -  き/木 + く/艹 + り/分  =  梹
  -  か/金 + く/艹 + り/分  =  鋲
  -  く/艹 + や/疒  =  岳
  -  む/車 + く/艹 + selector 4  =  蚯
  -  さ/阝 + く/艹 + selector 4  =  邱
  -  そ/馬 + く/艹 + selector 4  =  駈

Compounds of 卉

  -  く/艹 + selector 6 + も/門  =  蒭
  -  く/艹 + selector 6 + つ/土  =  蕘

Compounds of 升

  -  日 + く/艹  =  昇
  -  き/木 + 比 + く/艹  =  枡
  -  さ/阝 + 日 + く/艹  =  陞

Compounds of 黒

  -  火 + く/艹  =  燻
  -  よ/广 + し/巿 + く/艹  =  廛
  -  ゆ/彳 + し/巿 + く/艹  =  黴
  -  ⺼ + し/巿 + く/艹  =  黶

Other compounds

  -  こ/子 + く/艹  =  告
  -  は/辶 + く/艹  =  造
  -  る/忄 + は/辶 + く/艹  =  慥
  -  せ/食 + く/艹  =  酷
  -  日 + こ/子 + く/艹  =  晧
  -  き/木 + こ/子 + く/艹  =  梏
  -  え/訁 + こ/子 + く/艹  =  誥
  -  火 + こ/子 + く/艹  =  靠
  -  く/艹 + 宿 + せ/食  =  鵠
  -  に/氵 + く/艹  =  流
  -  へ/⺩ + く/艹  =  琉
  -  よ/广 + く/艹  =  疏
  -  心 + よ/广 + く/艹  =  蔬
  -  ま/石 + く/艹  =  硫
  -  ほ/方 + 宿 + く/艹  =  旒
  -  き/木 + 宿 + く/艹  =  梳
  -  龸 + selector 4 + く/艹  =  毓
  -  せ/食 + 宿 + く/艹  =  醯
  -  く/艹 + 宿 + 火  =  熏
  -  せ/食 + く/艹 + 火  =  醺
  -  そ/馬 + く/艹  =  馴
  -  く/艹 + さ/阝  =  危
  -  ⺼ + く/艹 + さ/阝  =  脆
  -  え/訁 + く/艹 + さ/阝  =  詭
  -  み/耳 + く/艹 + さ/阝  =  跪
  -  せ/食 + く/艹 + さ/阝  =  鮠
  -  く/艹 + う/宀/#3  =  急
  -  ち/竹 + く/艹  =  筑
  -  め/目 + 宿 + く/艹  =  瞿
  -  く/艹 + そ/馬 + 比  =  麁

Notes

Braille patterns